Maynadier is a surname. Notable people with the surname include:

 Clément Maynadier (born 1988), French rugby player
 Henry E. Maynadier (died 1868), American military officer